Oeneis (the Arctics or graylings) is a butterfly genus of the Satyrinae. All but one of its members are Arctic, sub-Arctic or high-altitude alpine in distribution. Some of the members of the genus are among the butterflies that can get along in the harshest climates of any butterflies. Four species in Europe, more are found in Arctic Russia, Siberia, Mongolia, Arctic North America and the Rocky Mountains. Curiously, there are no observations from Greenland. The development of most species takes two years.

Species
Listed alphabetically within groups:

The jutta species group:
Oeneis fulla (Eversmann, 1851)
Oeneis jutta (Hübner, 1805–1806) – Baltic grayling or Jutta Arctic
Oeneis magna (Graeser, 1888)
Oeneis melissa (Fabricius, 1775) – Melissa Arctic 
Oeneis tunga (Staudinger, 1894)

The norna species group:
Oeneis actaeoides (Lukhtanov, 1989)
Oeneis glacialis (Moll, 1785) – Alpine grayling
Oeneis norna (Thunberg, 1791) – Norse grayling
Oeneis philipi (Troubridge, 1988)
Oeneis polixenes (Fabricius, 1775) – Polixenes Arctic
Oeneis rosovi (Kurentzov 1960) – Philip's Arctic

The alpina species group:
Oeneis alpina (Kurentzov, 1970) – sentinel Arctic

The hora species group:
Oeneis aktashi (Lukhtanov, 1984)
Oeneis ammosovi (Dubatov & Korshunov, 1988)
Oeneis elwesi (Staudinger, 1901)
Oeneis hora (Grum-Grshimailo, 1888)
Oeneis mulla (Staudinger, 1881)

The bore species group:
Oeneis alberta (Elwes, 1893) – Alberta Arctic 
Oeneis ammon (Elwes, 1899)
Oeneis bore (Schneider, 1792) – Arctic grayling or white-veined Arctic
Oeneis chryxus (Doubleday, 1849) – brown Arctic or chryxus Arctic 
Oeneis ivallda (Mead, 1878) – California Arctic 
Oeneis nevadensis (C. & R. Felder, 1866) – great Arctic 
Oeneis macounii (Edwards, 1885) – Canada Arctic or Macoun's Arctic
Oeneis tanana (Warren & Nakahara 2016)

The tarpeja species group:
Oeneis diluta (Lukhtanov, 1994)
Oeneis lederi (Alphéraky, 1897)
Oeneis mongolica (Oberthür, 1876)
Oeneis sculda (Eversmann, 1851)
Oeneis tarpeja (Pallas, 1771)
Oeneis uhleri (Reakirt, 1866) – Uhler's Arctic
Oeneis urda (Eversmann, 1847)

The buddha species group:
Oeneis buddha (Grum-Grshimailo, 1891)
Oeneis oeno (Boisduval, 1832)

References

External links
Images representing Oeneis at Consortium for the Barcode of Life

 
Satyrini
Butterflies of Europe
Insects of the Arctic
Butterfly genera
Taxa named by Jacob Hübner